Will Johnson (born March 23, 1971) is an American musician, singer-songwriter, author and painter who is the lead singer of the bands Centro-matic and South San Gabriel. Called "one of the most prolific artists in American indie rock", Johnson has also released solo records, and is a member of the bands Monsters of Folk, New Multitudes and Overseas, and has also performed as part of the Undertow Orchestra.

Early life 
Johnson was born in Kennett, Missouri. When he was 11 years old, his mother remarried and the family moved to Killeen, Texas.

Johnson attended the University of North Texas, where he was involved in Denton's active music scene. He double-majored in English and elementary education.

Music career

Early music 
Johnson began playing drums, piano and sang in his church choir at an early age.  After moving to Killeen, Texas, from Kennett, Missouri, he was a founding member and drummer for the jangle-rock band The Benjamins.  They released two cassettes in 1988 and 1989 before Johnson left to attend the University of North Texas. While there, Johnson played in bands such as Polyester, Salt Lick, The Dooms UK, and was a founding member of Baboon.

Funland 
On Super Bowl Sunday 1991, Johnson joined Peter Schmidt and Clark Vogeler to form the band Melt, which changed its name to Funland in 1992. Funland signed with Arista Records that year, releasing the EP Sweetness in March 1993.  The band toured regularly in the US and released its only full-length album, The Funland Band, on Steve Records in 1995.  After five and a half years, Funland disbanded in June 1996.

Centro-matic 

Centro-matic began as a four-track cassette project when Johnson returned to college in May 1995.  It was the first time he had written and sung songs, and later that year saw the release of the cassette Non-Directional Jetpack Race. A handful of 7-inch releases followed, and Johnson began playing live under the Centro-matic moniker in March 1996 as a solo performance with electric guitar and vocals.  In December 1996, Johnson recorded the first Centro-matic full-length album, Redo The Stacks. Johnson played all the instruments except violin (Scott Danbom) and cello (Lindsay Romig), with a longtime friend Matt Pence engineering the lo-fi record.

In February 1997, Johnson started performing full-band Centro-matic shows with Mark Hedman on bass guitar and Pence on drums.  Choosing to keep things informal, the band's first rehearsal was held after its second show.  In March 1997, Danbom joined the band on the piano, fiddle, bass guitar, and vocals. Centro-matic continued to record and tour extensively in the United States and Europe under the same lineup until deciding to disband in 2014.

The band released ten albums and five EPs, plus several 7-inch recordings, cassettes, and compilation, and soundtrack appearances. The band worked with Jeff Powell, Anders Parker and Scott Solter.  The full-lengths Navigational, B-sides compilation Static vs. The Strings Vol. 1 and All The Falsest Hearts Can Try was recorded at Jay Farrar's studio in Millstadt, Illinois. The band subsequently recorded most of its material at The Echo Lab in Argyle, Texas.

South San Gabriel 

With his Centro-matic bandmates, Johnson formed the band South San Gabriel in the spring of 2001. It resulted from Centro-matic wanting to collaborate with and include other musicians while experimenting with a more spacious and atmospheric approach to writing and recording. South San Gabriel has a fluid lineup, with the band performing with anywhere from 3–10 members.  South San Gabriel has released three full-length albums, plus EPs and singles.

Molina and Johnson 

Johnson collaborated with songwriter Jason Molina for the joint album Molina and Johnson, released on the Secretly Canadian label in November 2009. They met by chance at the SXSW festival in Austin in 2003 or 2004. They recorded the album over a week and a half in early 2008. Johnson describes Molina as a "whirlwind of dedication and activity". Another collaboration was discussed but it never came to fruition before Molina's death in 2013.

Undertow Orchestra 

Johnson has performed as part of the Undertow Orchestra with David Bazan, Vic Chesnutt and Mark Eitzel.  Johnson first met Chestnutt in 1999 in Dallas. Chesnutt was a fan of Eitzel's music, and the two were long-time friends.

According to Johnson, Bob Andrews, the manager for the four musicians, had the idea in 2005 to create a band called the Undertow Orchestra from members of the Undertow Music Collective. Johnson said Chesnutt was adamant that the shows not feature any solo performances, with the members working to play each other's songs as backing musicians.

Monsters of Folk 

Johnson performed with indie supergroup Monsters of Folk as the drummer on a 2009 tour. The group included Jim James, Conor Oberst, M. Ward and Mike Mogis.  The band toured the US and Europe and performed on PBS show Austin City Limits in October 2010. Johnson became an official member of the band during that time.

New Multitudes 

From 2009 to 2012, Johnson collaborated with Jay Farrar, Jim James, and Anders Parker on the Woody Guthrie archive project New Multitudes.  The project involved the four songwriters setting music to Guthrie's unrecorded lyrics, and was recorded in several locations. The tribute album was released in 2012 with a short US tour following.

Overseas 

Johnson formed the band Overseas in 2009 with David Bazan and Matt and Bubba Kadane. An eponymous album was released in 2013.

Other 
As part of the Monsters of Folk, Johnson participated in Neil Young's Bridge School Benefit in 2009. At the benefit, Johnson reconnected with former babysitter and family friend Sheryl Crow, who is also from Johnson's hometown.

Writing 
Johnson authored a novel If or When I Call which was published by Goliad Media and released on March 15, 2021.

Painting 
An avid baseball fan as a child, Johnson roots for the St. Louis Cardinals. Since 2008 Johnson has produced folk art paintings, mostly centering on the subject of baseball and its history. Commissions from friends eventually led to his work being exhibited in group and solo art shows.

Exhibitions 
 April 2009: Cactus Music/The Record Ranch
 August 2009: Good Records – Joint show with Matt Pence
 2010: IF+D Gallery, Austin, TX – Solo show
 2010: Bottletree, Birmingham, AL (2010) – Group show with Elliott McPherson
 2010: The Downtown Gallery, Tuscaloosa, AL – Group show
 2010: Bergino Gallery, New York, NY – Group show
 2011: The Meme Gallery, Denton, TX – Solo show
 2011: Lancaster Museum of Art, Lancaster, PA – Group show
 2012: Webb Gallery, Waxahachie, TX – Group show with Jad Fair, David Fair, Tim Kerr, and Dan Phillips
 2012: Team Love Gallery, New Paltz, NY – Solo show
 2013: Yard Dog Gallery, Austin, TX – Solo show
 2014: Bergino Gallery, New York, NY – Solo show
 2014: Cenote, Austin, TX – Group show with Jessie Johnson
 2015: Yard Dog Gallery, Austin, TX – Solo show
 2015: Pioneer House, Knoxville, TN – Solo show
 2016: Neighborhood Gallery, Dallas, TX – Group show with Tim Kerr
 2017: Collide, Austin, TX – Group show with Mollie Tuggle
 2020: Kessler Theater, Dallas, TX – Group show with Bruce Lee Webb and Tim Kerr
 2020: Lenny's, Bloomington, IN – Solo show
 2022: Yard Dog Gallery, Austin, TX - Solo Show

Personal life 
As of 2022, Johnson currently lives in Hays County, Texas .

Discography

Solo Discography 
 LPs
 Will Johnson: Murder Of Tides (Undertow Music Collective 2002)
 Will Johnson: Vultures Await (Misra/Munich 2004)
 Will Johnson: Survey/Voyage (Misra 2005)
 Will Johnson: Scorpion (Undertow Music Collective 2012)
 Will Johnson: Swan City Vampires (Undertow Music Collective 2015)
 Will Johnson: Hatteras Night, A Good Luck Charm (Undertow Music Collective 2017)
 Will Johnson: Wire Mountain (Keeled Scales 2019)
 Will Johnson: El Capitan (Keeled Scales 2020)

 EPs
 Will Johnson: CDEP (Sixgunlover 2005)
 Will Johnson: Little Raider EP (Reelfoot Transmissions 2011)

7" records
 Split w/ The pAperchAse (Idol 2004)
 Blackest Sparrow/Darkest Night 8" Lathe (People in a Position To Know 2007)

 Soundtracks
 Greater Southbridge (2003)
 "Hill Country" Documentary (University of Texas 2007)

Collaborations
 Will Johnson/Jason Molina: Molina and Johnson (Secretly Canadian 2009)
New Multitudes (Rounder 2012), with Jay Farrar, Anders Parker, and Yim Yames
 Overseas: S/T (Undertow Music Collective) 2013
 Marie/Lepanto: Tenkiller (Big Legal Mess 2018)
 Marie/Lepanto:  Gulf Collide (Constant Stranger, 2021)
 Marie/Lepanto:  The Fix Is On (Constant Stranger, 2022)

 Compilation appearances
 The Six Parts Seven Lost Notes From Forgotten Songs" (Suicide Squeeze, 2003) [Will Johnson sings "Song Of Impossible Things"]
 "Just To Know What You've Been Dreaming" on Across The Great Divide: Music Inspired By The Band (Uncut, 2005) [United Kingdom]
 "The Schizmatists' Curse" on Songs For Another Place (Awful Bliss, 2005) [Italy]
 "Cracking Of The Seal" on Turn 1 (Almost There, 2005)
 "Catherine Dupree" on Live at KDHX, Vol. 4 (KDHX, 2006)
 "Just To Know What You've Been Dreaming" on We Have The Technology (Misra, 2006) [compilation also includes Centro-Matic]
 "Hearts" [Huey Lewis and The News cover] on Are You Still With Me?! (Bandcamp, 2008) [free digital compilation]
 "Just To Know What You've Been Dreaming" on New Colors (Misra, 2007) [compilation also features Centro-Matic and South San Gabriel]
 J. Matthew Gerken, Christian Kiefer, and Jefferson Pitcher Of Great And Mortal Men: 43 Songs For 43 presidents (Standard Recording Company, 2009) [Will Johnson contributes]
 "The Big Game Is Every Night" [Songs: Ohia cover] on Weary Engine Blues (Graveface, 2013)
 "34 Blues" [Molina and Johnson cover] on Farewell Transmission (Rock The Cause, 2014) [with Briton Biesenherz]

 Producer
 Austin Collins: Roses Are Black (2008)
 Telegraph Canyon: The Tide and the Current (2009)
 Collin Herring: Ocho (2009)
 Austin Collins: Wrong Control (2010)
 Chris Porter: This Red Mountain (2014)
 Chris Porter: Don't Go Baby, It's Gonna Get Weird Without You (2017)
 Jon Hoff: Forthcoming Release TBA
 Parker Twomey: Forthcoming Release TBA
 Austin Lucas: co-producer, Immortal Americans
 Clap Your Hands Say Yeah: co-producer, New Fragility

 Touring or guest musician
 Funland: Drums, Vocals 1991–1996
 Varnaline: Guitar, Vocals Winter and Spring 2002
 Jay Bennett and Edward Burch: Drums, Vocals 2002
 Undertow Orchestra: Guitar, Vocals, Drums 2006
 Son Volt: Drums, October 2007
 Jandek: Drums Summer 2007, Spring 2008
 Monahans: Guitar, Vocals Spring 2008
 The New Year: Guitar, Fall 2008
 Patterson Hood and The Screwtopians: Guitar, Vocals. Summer 2009
 Monsters Of Folk: Drums, Vocals Fall 2009
 Strand Of Oaks:  Drums, Stephen Colbert Show Appearance 2019

 Guest musician/vocalist
 Little Grizzly: Please Let Me Go, It Wasn't Meant To Be (1999)
 Little Grizzly: I'd Be Lying If I Said I Wasn't Scared (2001)
 Deathray Davies: Return of the Drunken Ventriloquist (2001)
 The pAperchAse: Hide The Kitchen Knives (2002)
 Drive-By Truckers: Brighter Than Creation's Dark (2008)
 Austin Collins: Roses Are Black (2008)
 Patterson Hood: Murdering Oscar And Other Love Songs (2009)
 Telegraph Canyon: The Tide and the Current (2009)
 Collin Herring: Ocho (2009)
 Monahans: Dim The Aurora (2009)
 Craig Finn:  Clear Heart Full Eyes (2012)
 Patterson Hood:  Heat Lightning Rumbles in the Distance (2012)
. Austin Lucas: Immortal Americans (2018)
. Clap Your Hands Say Yeah: New Fragility (2021)

 Film appearances
 Salt Creek County (Downstate Productions 2008)

Centro-matic Discography
LPs:
 Redo the Stacks (Steve 1996)
 Navigational (Idol 1999)
 The Static vs. The Strings Vol. 1 (Idol/Quality Park 1999)
 All the Falsest Hearts Can Try (Idol/Quality Park/Munich 1999)
 South San Gabriel Songs/Music (Idol/Munich 2000) [credited to South San Gabriel on Netherlands release]
 Distance and Clime (Idol/Munich 2001)
 Love You Just The Same (Misra/Munich 2003)
 Fort Recovery (Misra/Cooking Vinyl/Houston Party 2006)
 Centro-matic/South San Gabriel: Dual Hawks 2 CD/LP (Misra/Cooking Vinyl/Houston Party 2008)
 Candidate Waltz (Undertow Music Collective 2011)
 Take Pride in Your Long Odds (Navigational Transmissions 2014)

Singles and EPs:
 Most Everyone Will Find + 2 (Munich, 2000) [Netherlands]
 "Truth Flies Out" + 2 (Munich, 2001) [Netherlands]
 Vermont + Centro-Matic = Opportunity split EP with Vermont (Quality Park, 2001)
 Flashes and Cables + 5 EP (Misra, 2004)
 Triggers and Trash Heaps + 3 EP (Misra, 2006)
 "The Fugitives Have Won" + 2 EP (Cooking Vinyl, 2006) [United Kingdom]
 Live at Austin City Limits Music Festival (self-released, 2006) [14-track digital-only release on Amazon and iTunes; no longer available]
 Operation Motorcide EP (Houston Party, 2007) [Spain]
 Eyas split EP with South San Gabriel (self-released, 2010) [digital-only release on Amazon and iTunes]

7-inch Records:
 Transistor EP (Automatic, 1996)
 Forget The Sixth Step (Steve, 1996)
 Tympanum (Transcontinental Recording Company/Quality Park, 1997)
 "Love Has Found Me Somehow" split 7-inch with Tripping Daisy (Good, 1999)

Cassettes:
 Non-Directional Jetpack Race (Steve, 1995)
 Line Connection Aim (self-released, 1997)

Compilation Appearances:
 "Misunderstanding Surplus in the Getaway Car" on Dallas Observer Scene/Heard, Vol. 2 (1995) [as 'The Centromatic Band']
 "My, My" on Band-Kits: A Collection of Music From Denton, Texas (Quality Park, 2000)
 "Most Everyone Will Find" on Orgasm 04 (Oor Magazine, 2000) [Netherlands]
 "Fuselage (It's Starting To Look Like Christmas Once Again)" on Electric Ornaments (Idol, 2000)
 "Most Everyone Will Find" on Awesome (Munich, 2001) [Netherlands]
 "Truth Flies Out" on  Esto No Es Un Cactus (Sinedin, 2001) [Spain; compilation also includes South San Gabriel]
 "Fountains Of Fire" on New Voices, Vol 48 (Rolling Stone, 2001) [Germany]
 "Truth Flies Out" on Orgasm 07 (Oor Magazine, 2001) [Netherlands]
 "To Unleash The Horses Now" on Sounds of the New West Vol. 3 (Uncut Magazine, 2002) [United Kingdom]
 "Huge In Every City" and "On the Sagtikos" on Vital Idol: Idol Records Sampler (Idol, 2003)
 Just For Fun (Loretta Records, 2003)
 "Fuselage (It's Starting To Look Like Christmas Once Again)" on De Avonden Xmas 2003 (VPRO Radio, 2003) [Netherlands]
 "Silver Plate Complaints" on New Noises, Vol. 60 (Rolling Stone, 2003) [Germany]
 "Flashes and Cables" on Musikexpress 81 – Sounds Now! (Musikexpress, 2003) [Germany]
 "Covered Up In Mines" on Already Gone: A Compilation of Texas Bands (Already Gone, 2004)
 "Triggers and Trash Heaps" on We Have The Technology (Misra, 2006) [compilation also includes Will Johnson]
 "Don't Talk (Put Your Head On My Shoulder)" [Beach Boys cover] on Do It Again: A Tribute To Pet Sounds (Houston Party, 2006) [Spain]
 "Flashes and Cables" on New Colors (Misra, 2007) [compilation also features South San Gabriel and Will Johnson]
 "I, The Kite" on Great (Misra/Absolutely Kosher, 2008) [promo CD-R]
 "Love Has Found Me Somehow" on A Splash Of Sunshine, Vol. 2 (679 Recordings, 2008)

South San Gabriel Discography

 AlbumsSongs/Music (Munich, 2000) [Netherlands; credited to Centro-Matic on U.S. release]Welcome, Convalescence (Munich, 2003) [Netherlands]The Carlton Chronicles – Not Until the Operation's Through (Misra, 2005)Dual Hawks split double album with Centro-Matic (Misra, 2008)

 Singles and EPs
 "Stark Miami Mines" split 7-inch with Okkervil River (Tight Spot, 2002)
 I Am Six Pounds Of Dynamite + 3 (Munich, 2005)
 Eyas split EP with Centro-Matic (2010) [digital-only release on Amazon and iTunes]

 Compilation appearances
 "Evangeline" on Awesome (Munich, 2001) [compilation also features Centro-Matic]
 "One Hundred Thousand Bridesmaids" on Esto No Es Un Cactus (Sinedin, 2001) [Spain; compilation also features Centro-Matic]
 "Smelling Medicinal" on All Areas, Vol. 41 (Visions Magazine, 2003) [Germany]
 "I Am Six Pounds of Dynamite" on Gimme Danger (Uncut Magazine, 2005) [United Kingdom]
 "I Feel Too Young To Die" on We Have The Technology (Misra, 2006) [compilation also features Centro-Matic]
 "I Feel Too Young To Die" on New Colors (Misra, 2007) [compilation also features Centro-Matic and Will Johnson]
 "Emma Jane" on Houston Party 10 Aniversario'' (Sinedin, 2008)

References

External links 

 
 

Living people
American rock musicians
Musicians from Austin, Texas
1971 births
People from Kennett, Missouri
People from Killeen, Texas
Monsters of Folk members
Overseas (band) members
Misra Records artists
Secretly Canadian artists